Elaine Anderson Steinbeck (born Mary Elaine Anderson; August 14, 1914 – April 27, 2003) was an American actress and stage manager. She was the widow of author John Steinbeck.

Biography 
Anderson was born on August 14, 1914, in Austin, Texas, to Libbie Adeline (née Roberts) and Waverly F. Anderson. Her maternal great-grandfather was Judge John Bryant Dupuy of Erath County, Texas. 

On February 21, 1934, Anderson married actor Zachary Scott, whom she met while they both studied in the University of Texas at Austin theatre program. Anderson studied drama at the University of Texas, Austin. She worked with Scott at the Austin Little Theatre for several years, and in the process they met several people with connections in the New York theatre. Around 1940, the Scotts moved to New York City to seek success there. Though both wished to be successful actors, Zachary had more success in that area, so Elaine began working for The Theatre Guild in New York and learned the technical aspects of theatre production.

In late 1944, Elaine gave up her career to relocate to Hollywood with Zachary, who had signed a seven-year contract with Warner Brothers. 

The Scotts had a daughter and divorced in 1949.

Within a week of her divorce from Scott, Elaine married writer John Steinbeck on December 28, 1950. They had no children together and remained married until his death in December 1968.

Anderson died of natural causes on April 27, 2003, in Manhattan at the age of 88.  She was buried near Steinbeck in the Garden of Memories Memorial Park in Salinas, California.

Works

Film
Anderson is said to have made uncredited appearances in two 1944 B-movies: A Night of Adventure, and Seven Days Ashore ("girl in band").

Published works

References

Jones, Kenneth. "Elaine Steinbeck, Author's Widow and Former Stage Manager, Dead at 88" Playbill April 29, 2003. September 20, 2005 
Lisheron, Mark. "Who was Zachary Scott?" Zachary Scott Theatre Center. September 20, 2005 
Van Neste, Dan. "Zachary Scott: A Scoundrel with Style" Classic Images March, 1998. September 20, 2005 
Woo, Elaine. "From the pages of his life, her legacy of love and work", Sydney Morning Herald, May 14, 2003. September 20, 2005

External links
 
 

Actresses from Austin, Texas
1914 births
2003 deaths
American film actresses
20th-century American actresses
Moody College of Communication alumni
21st-century American women